Bill Walsh College Football '95 is a video game of the sports genre released in 1994 by EA Sports, and a follow-up to Bill Walsh College Football.

Gameplay
It features former NFL and then Stanford Cardinal football head coach Bill Walsh on the cover and several Stanford players. It also features the 1993 rosters of the college football teams featured.

Reception

References

External links
 
 

1994 video games
College football video games
EA Sports games
Electronic Arts games
Multiplayer and single-player video games
NCAA video games
North America-exclusive video games
Sega Genesis games
Sega Genesis-only games
Video games based on real people
Walsh
Walsh
Video games developed in the United States
High Score Productions games